Sharon Kellett (born 29 March 1968) is an Australian swimmer. She competed in two events at the 1984 Summer Olympics.

References

1968 births
Living people
Australian female swimmers
Olympic swimmers of Australia
Swimmers at the 1984 Summer Olympics
Place of birth missing (living people)
20th-century Australian women